The Mercedes-Benz M106 engine is a high-revving, prototype, four-stroke, 2.5-liter, naturally aspirated, V-6 racing engine, designed, developed and produced by Mercedes-Benz for the DTM and later ITC, between 1994 and 1996.

History
The new M106 six-cylinder replaced the previous four-cylinder engine used in the Mercedes-Benz 190E during the past seasons. It is a brand-new V6 with a displacement of just under 2.5 liters. Very loosely based on the 4.2 liter V8 used in the E 420 and S 420 models, the new engine uses a cylinder bank V-angle of 90 degrees. Equipped with twin overhead camshafts and four valves per cylinder, the compact unit nevertheless only weighed  due to extensive use of alloys. While Alfa Romeo's model featured four driven wheels, Mercedes-Benz was restricted to only a rear-wheel drive setup for their new DTM racer as none of the road-going C-Class models used four-wheel drive.

Applications
Mercedes-Benz C-Class DTM (W202)

References

Mercedes-Benz
V6 engines
Mercedes-Benz engines
Gasoline engines by model
Engines by model
Piston engines
Internal combustion engine